Psychotic Supper is the third studio album from the American hard rock band Tesla, released in 1991. The album peaked at 13 on the Billboard 200, and was certified platinum by RIAA on November 5, 1993.

Music
The album "[mashes] a few convincing pop-metal hits with moderate stabs at the Black Crowes' roots rock purity".

Reception
The album's reception was mostly positive. Steve Huey from AllMusic, gave the album three-and-a-half stars, saying, "[the album] benefits from a more stripped-down production than The Great Radio Controversy, using fewer overdubs and thereby enhancing Tesla's bluesy, acoustic-tinged rock & roll". In 2005, Psychotic Supper was ranked number 475 in Rock Hard magazine's book of The 500 Greatest Rock & Metal Albums of All Time.
The album was retrospectively called Tesla's peak, by Ultimate Classic Rock writer Matt Wardlaw in 2016.

Track listing

Personnel
Tesla
Jeff Keith – vocals
Tommy Skeoch – guitars
Frank Hannon – guitars, piano, synth, organ
Brian Wheat – bass
Troy Luccketta – drums

Production
Lee Anthony – mixing assistant
Michael Barbiero – arranger, composer, engineer, mixing, producer
George Cowan – engineer
Victor Deyglio – engineer
Lolly Grodner – mixing assistant

Art
Nick Egan – art direction, design
Michael Halsband – photography

Charts
Album

Singles and album tracks

Certifications

References

Tesla (band) albums
1991 albums
Geffen Records albums